Eduardo de Góes "Edu" Lobo (born August 29, 1943) is a Brazilian singer, guitarist, and composer.

In the 1960s he was part of the bossa nova movement.

His compositions include Upa Neguinho (with Gianfrancesco Guarnieri), Pra Dizer Adeus (with Torquato Neto; also known in its English version as "To say goodbye"), Choro Bandido, A história de Lily Braun, Beatriz (the latter three songs with Chico Buarque), Arrastão and Canto triste (both with Vinicius de Moraes), and Ponteio (with Capinam). Ponteio won best song at the 3rd Festival de Música Popular Brasileira in the recording by Quarteto Novo in 1967.

He has worked with, and his songs have been covered by, artists including Toots Thielemans, Marcos Valle, Elis Regina, Sylvia Telles, Sergio Mendes, Antonio Carlos Jobim, Milton Nascimento, Maria Bethânia, Gilberto Gil, Gal Costa, Caetano Veloso, Monica Salmaso, Sarah Vaughan, Earth, Wind & Fire, and Caterina Valente.

Dos Navegantes, a collaboration album by him, Romero Lubambo and Mauro Senise, won the 2017 Latin Grammy Award for Best MPB Album.

Discography

A musica de Edú Lobo Por Edu Lobo – Edú Lobo – 1964 Elenco
Edú canta Zumbi – 1965 Som Maior
Edú & Bethania – Edú Lobo / Maria Bethania – 1966 Elenco 
Reencontro – Sylvia Telles / Edú Lobo / Trio Tamba / Quinteto Villa-Lobos – 1966 
Edú – 1967 Philips
Edú Canta Zumbi – 1968 Elenco
Sergio Mendes Presents Lobo – Edú Lobo – (A&M, 1970)
Cantiga de longe – Edú Lobo – 1970 Elenco 
Missa Breve – Edú Lobo / Milton Nascimento – 1972 EMI Odeon 
Deus lhe pague – Varios / Several – 1976 EMI ODEON 
Limite das aguas – Edú Lobo – 1976 Continental 
Camaleão – Edú Lobo – 1978 Philips 
Tempo presente – Edú Lobo – 1980 Polygram
Edú & Tom – Edú Lobo / Tom Jobim – 1981 Polygram 
Jogos de Dança – 1981 – 
O Grande Circo Místico – Milton Nascimento / Jane Duboc / Gal Costa / Simone / Gilberto Gil / Tim Maia / Zizi Possi / Chico Buarque / Edú Lobo – 1983 Som Livre
Dança da Meia Lua – Edu Lobo – 1985 Sigla 
O Corsário do Rei – Fagner / Edú Lobo / ChicoBuarque / Blitz / Gal Costa / MPB4 / Nana Caymmi / Lucinha Lins / Tom Jobim / Zé Renato / Claudio Nucci / Ivan Lins / Marco N – 1985 Som Livre 
Rá-Tim-Bum – Boca Livre, Caetano Veloso, Joyce, Maíra, Quarteto Quatro por Quatro, Ze Renato, Edú Lobo, Jane Duboc, Rosa Maria – 1989 – 
Corrupião – Edú Lobo – 1993 Velas
Meia Noite – Edú Lobo, Dori Caymmi – 1995 Velas
Songbook Edú Lobo – Varios / Various – 1995 Lumiar Discos 
Album de Teatro – 1997 BMG 
Cambaio – Edú Lobo / Chico Buarque / Gal Costa / Lenine / Zizi Possi – 2002
Tantas Marés – 2010 Biscoito Fino
Dos Navegantes – Edú Lobo / Romero Lubambo / Mauro Senise – 2017 Biscoito Fino
With Paul Desmond
From the Hot Afternoon (A&M/CTI, 1969)

References

External links
Official website

Brazilian  male guitarists
 
1943 births
Living people
Bossa nova guitarists
Bossa nova singers
Brazilian jazz singers
Latin jazz singers
Música Popular Brasileira singers
20th-century guitarists
21st-century guitarists
20th-century Brazilian male singers
20th-century Brazilian singers
21st-century Brazilian male singers
21st-century Brazilian singers
Latin Grammy Award winners
Male jazz musicians
Latin music songwriters